Marcus Theodore Johnson was a British businessman and member of the Legislative Council of Hong Kong.

Johnson joined the Hongkong and Shanghai Banking Corporation and was the Deputy Chairman of the bank in 1937. He was also Chairman of the Hong Kong Jockey Club from 1935 to 1939.

He was made Justice of the Peace and was appointed to the Legislative Council of Hong Kong during the Sir H. E. Pollock on leave in May 1936, and was appointed to the Legislative Council again in 1937 vice Arthur William Hughes's resignation.

References

Hong Kong bankers
British bankers
Members of the Legislative Council of Hong Kong
HSBC people
British expatriates in Hong Kong

20th-century Hong Kong people
Year of birth missing
Year of death missing